The Men's triple jump event at the 2011 World Championships in Athletics was held at the Daegu Stadium on September 2 and 4.

Seven made the automatic qualifying mark.  The eventual winner was not one of them, barely qualifying with the 9th best mark.

Favorite Phillips Idowu led through the first three rounds as Will Claye failed to make a legal jump through the first two rounds, waited until his third jump to jump 17.50, to not only qualify for his final three jumps but to move into second place.  In the fourth round, unheralded American collegian Christian Taylor popped 17.96, the number ten all time jump to blast into the lead.  Idowu jumped 17.77 in his fourth attempt but was unable to improve upon that.

Medalists

Records
Prior to the competition, the established records were as follows.

Qualification standards

Schedule

Results

Qualification
Qualification: Qualifying Performance 17.10 (Q) or at least 12 best performers (q) advance to the final.

Final

References

External links
Triple jump results at IAAF website

Triple jump
Triple jump at the World Athletics Championships